Passionflix is an OTT entertainment streaming platform and production company. The platform was created and co-founded in 2017 by director and producer Tosca Musk, producer Jina Panebianco, and writer Joany Kane. Passionflix focuses on releasing original film adaptations from best selling romance novels, while also streaming classic romance movies.

Establishment 
In 2015, Joany Kane had the concept of creating a streaming romance novel service for women. Tosca Musk and Jina Panebianco joined Kane in her efforts to create this platform and Passionflix was launched in May 2017.

Investors in Passionflix include Dana Guerin, Patrick Cheung, Jason Calacanis, Bill Lee, Lyn and Norman Lear (who produced All in the Family and many other TV classics), and Kimbal Musk (Tosca's and Elon's brother).

Original adaptations

Passionflix originals

Series adaptations

Quickie short films

Upcoming projects 

Several adaptation projects are in progress, including the novels:

 Brave by Jennifer L. Armentrout 
 Three Wishes by Kristen Ashley 
 Beauty from Pain, Beauty from Surrender and Beauty from Love by Georgia Cates
 Royally Screwed by Emma Chase
 The Air He Breathes by Brittany Cherry
 Withering Hope by Layla Hagen
 A Man's Promise and A Lover's Vow by Brenda Jackson 
 Something About You by Julie James 
 Escaping Reality, Infinite Possibilities, Forsaken and Unbroken by Lisa Renee Jones
 Sugar Daddy by Lisa Kleypas 
 This Man, Beneath This Man and This Man Confessed by Jodi Ellen Malpas
 Come Away With Me and Easy Love by Kristen Proby
 Gabriel's Redemption by Sylvain Reynard 
 Fighting to Breathe by Aurora Rose Reynolds
 Lick by Kylie Scott

References

External links 
Passionflix IMDB
Passionflix Instagram
Passionflix Twitter
Passionflix Facebook Page
Passionflix YouTube Channel

Streaming television
Romance films
Internet properties established in 2017